This article lists the results for the American Samoa national football team.

Key

Key to matches
Att. = Match attendance
(H) = Home ground
(A) = Away ground
(N) = Neutral ground

Key to record by opponent
Pld = Games played
W = Games won
D = Games drawn
L = Games lost
GF = Goals for
GA = Goals against

Results
American Samoa's score is shown first in each case.

Notes

Record by opponent

Up to matches played on 18 July 2019.

References

American Samoa national football team results